Hartong is a surname of Dutch origin. Notable people with the surname include:

Corrie Hartong (1906–1991), Dutch dancer, dance teacher and choreographer
Emily Hartong (born 1992), American female volleyball player
Jan Laurens Hartong (1941–2016), Dutch pianist, composer, arranger and teacher
Laura Hartong (born 1958), British former television actress
Lucas Hartong (born 1963), Dutch politician

References

Surnames of Dutch origin